Meider may refer to:

 Hans Meidner (1914–2001), South African plant physiologist
 Ludwig Meidner (1884–1966), a Jewish German expressionist painter and printmaker
 Else Meidner, née Meyer (1901–1987), a Jewish German painter, wife of Ludwig Meidner
 Rudolf Alfred Meidner (1914–2005), a Jewish German-Swedish economist
 Rehn–Meidner Model, an economic model developed in 1951
 Rehn-Meidner Macroeconomics to Neo-liberalism

Jewish surnames
German-language surnames
Germanic-language surnames